David Gibbs (May 28, 1936 – January 13, 2013) was an American politician.

Born in West Point, Mississippi, Gibbs served in the Mississippi House of Representatives, as a Democrat, representing District 36 which covers parts of Clay, Lowndes, and Monroe counties, from 1992 until his death. Gibbs is a former chairman of the House County Affairs Committee. He resigned from office just a week before his death from cancer at Northeast Mississippi Medical Center in Tupelo, Mississippi.

Gibbs was a loan broker and consultant. He went to Faulkner University, Mississippi State University, and Kentucky State University. He served on the Clay County, Mississippi county board of supervisors.  He was also a member of the State Democratic Executive Committee in Mississippi.

Notes

1936 births
2013 deaths
County supervisors in Mississippi
People from West Point, Mississippi
Faulkner University alumni
Kentucky State University alumni
Mississippi State University alumni
Businesspeople from Mississippi
Democratic Party members of the Mississippi House of Representatives
21st-century American politicians
20th-century American businesspeople